Swatosch is a surname. Notable people with the surname include:

 Alois Swatosch (1910–?), Austrian boxer
 Ferdinand Swatosch (1894–1974), Austrian footballer and manager
 Jakob Swatosch (1891–1971), Austrian footballer

See also
 Svatoš

Surnames of Austrian origin